Amylibacter lutimaris is a Gram-negative, aerobic and non-motile bacterium from the genus of Amylibacter which has been isolated from tidal flat sediments from Korea.

References

Rhodobacteraceae
Bacteria described in 2018